was a Japanese physician specializing in leprosy. He worked at Nagashima Aiseien Sanatorium, Kikuchi Keifuen Sanatorium and Tama Zenshoen Sanatorium. In 1955, he proposed "acute infiltration" of Tajiri in leprosy.

Life
He was born in Tokyo in 1902, and graduated from Chiba Medical School in 1930. In the same year he started working at Tama Zenshoen Sanatorium. In 1931, he went to Nagashima Aiseien Sanatorium. He became Ph.D. for his studies on leprosy of the respiratory system. In 1947 he went to Tama Zenshoen Sanatorium. Between 1958 and 1963, he was the director of Kikuchi Keifuen Sanatorium, and later he worked at Tama Zenshoen Sanatorium. He died in 1966.

Published works
Leprosy of the respiratory system Report 1 Trachea, lung, Chiba Igaku Zasshi, 11,2,1933
Leprosy of the respiratory system Report 2 Nose, Repura, 5,4,467,1934
Leprosy of the respiratory system Report 3 Mouth, throat, Repura,6,5,1935
Leprotic changing in the lung, Int J Lepr 3,4,1935 
Leprosy and childbirth Int J Lepr 4,2,1936 
Acute infiltration of leprosy Int J Lepr 23,370-84,1955

For non-specialists
(Book）Leprosy medicine for general physicians (1951) Igakushoin, Tokyo.
(Easy medical lectures) Knowledge of Hansen's disease (1955-1960) in Zenkanryo (Patients' organization) Newspapers

In sanatoriums
In Nagashima Aiseien Sanatorium, he was not only a good clinician, but also helped Kensuke Mitsuda when various problems arose. He became the director of Kikuchi Keifuen Sanatorium after Matsuki Miyazaki. Tajiri started reducing the number of in-patients after the so-called "no-leprosy patient in our prefecture" movement.

Footnotes

References
The papers of Isamu Tajiri (1969)  Kikuchi Keifuen Patients Supporting Society.
Hyakunen no Seiso (2009), profiles of directors. Kikuchi Keifuen Sanatorium, Kohshi, Kumamoto.

1902 births
1966 deaths
People from Tokyo
Japanese leprologists
Japanese leper hospital administrators